Katharina Trost (born 28 June 1995) is a German track and field athlete who specializes in middle-distance running.

At 16, she competed at her first German Championships in the U18 class and took the 2nd place in 800 metres. Representing Germany at the 2019 World Athletics Championships, she reached the semi-finals in women's 800 metres.

Achievements 

 Gold medal in 800 metres at the 2019 German Indoor Athletics Championships
 Silver medal in 800 metres at the 2019 German Indoor Athletics Championships
 Gold medal in 3 x 800 metres relay at the 2019 German Athletics Championships.

References

External links

German female middle-distance runners
1995 births
Living people
World Athletics Championships athletes for Germany
People from Berchtesgadener Land
Sportspeople from Upper Bavaria
Athletes (track and field) at the 2020 Summer Olympics
Olympic athletes of Germany
20th-century German women
21st-century German women